Misato (written:  or ) is a Japanese surname. Notable people with the surname include:

, Japanese singer
, Ryukyuan politician and bureaucrat
, Ryukyuan prince

Japanese-language surnames